Chaos by Design is an album by New Zealand drum and bass group, Concord Dawn released in 2006. This album features tracks with Tiki of Salmonella Dub and Wellington soul singer Hollie Smith.

Track listing 
"Broken Eyes"
"Chloroform"
"One Night In Reno" featuring Devin Abrams
"Man For All Seasons" featuring Paul McLaney
"Lost At Sea"
"Aces High" featuring State of Mind
"Fly Away Home"
"Blow"
"Never Give Up On Love" featuring Tiki Taane
"You Don't Have To Run"
"Say Your Words" featuring Hollie Smith

References 

Uprising Records :: RISE009CD :: Chaos By Design. rolldabeats. Retrieved on 23 September 2008.

2006 albums
Concord Dawn albums